Oldbury-on-Severn is a small village near the mouth of the River Severn in the South Gloucestershire district of the county of Gloucestershire in the west of England. The parish, which includes the village of Cowhill had a population at the 2011 census of 780.
It is home to the nearby Oldbury nuclear power station, a Magnox power station which opened in 1967 and ceased operation on 29 February 2012.

The area has been considered for nuclear 'new build' totalling some 3000MWe of capacity – either two or three PWRs. This would be more than the river flow could provide cooling for and so natural-draught cooling towers with a possible height of 200m have been postulated as necessary (- the existing station is 54m high).

Village attractions include a footpath near the river, a pub known as the Anchor Inn plus the village hall and two churches. It is also the home of Thornbury Sailing Club.

The parish church is dedicated to St Arilda, a local saint and martyr whose origins may lie in the fourth or fifth century. The church is on a small hill (35m asl at ST609919) and is an excellent viewpoint, and, for river travellers, waymark.

References

External links

Oldbury on Severn Community Website
Oldbury-on-Severn.com (accommodation)
Oldbury nuclear power station Stakeholder Group
Thornbury Sailing Club

Populated places on the River Severn
Villages in South Gloucestershire District
Civil parishes in Gloucestershire